Valerianella ozarkana is a species of flowering plant in the honeysuckle family known by the common names Benjamin Franklin bush or Ozark cornsalad. It is found in Arkansas, Missouri and Oklahoma in the United States.

References

Flora of the United States
ozarkana
Plants described in 1938